Tirerill (Tír Oirill) is a barony in east Co. Sligo. It corresponds to the ancient túath of Tir Ollíol.

References

Baronies of County Sligo